Embekka Devalaya (Embekka Temple) was built by the King Vikramabahu III of Gampola Era (AD 1357–1374) in Sri Lanka. The Devalaya is dedicated to Kataragama deviyo. A local deity called Devatha Bandara is also worshiped at this site. The shrine consists of three sections, the "Sanctum of Garagha", the "Digge" or "Dancing Hall" and the "Hevisi Mandapaya" or the "Drummers' Hall". The Drummers' Hall has drawn the attention of visitors to the site, due to the splendid wood carvings of its ornate pillars and its high pitched roof.

Location 
Embekke Devalaya is situated in Medapalata Korale of Udunuwara in Kandy District. This is a sheltered place used to rest during long pilgrimage or long journeys in ancient days of Sri Lanka. This Ambalama is said to be built during AD 1341–1357 by the King Bhuwanekabhahu IV.

Carvings and woodwork 
It is said that some of the wood work utilized for the "Drummers' Hall" came from an abandoned "Royal Audience Hall" at Gampola. There is every possibility the hall has seen repairs during the reigns of the Sinhalese Kings of Kandy. The carvings, which adorn the wooden pillars of the drummers' hall, as well as the "Vahalkada" (the entrance porch of the Devala, which is said to be older) are some of the best examples of Sinhalese art. The base of the wooden pillars are octagonal shaped while their pillar top or "Pekada", has four leaves stacked in a square. The most noted and famous carvings out of them are the entwined swans, double headed eagles, entwined rope designs, breast-feeding image, a soldier fighting on horseback, female dancers, wrestlers, women emanating from a vein, bird-human hybrid, elephant-bull hybrid and elephant-lion hybrid.

The roof has significant features. The rafters all slant from above towards the incoming visitor are fixed together and kept in position by a "Madol Kurupawa", a kind of a giant catch pin the like of which we do not find elsewhere. When we consider the carvings of the entire temple there are about 125 series of decorations, 256 liyawela type designs, and 64 lotus designs, 30 decorative patterns and roof designs, ending up in 514 unique designs.

Gallery

References

External links 

Department of Archaeology, Sri Lanka
Lanka Library Forum

Buddhist temples in Kandy District
Archaeological protected monuments in Kandy District